TRMK may refer to:

 Trustmark, NASDAQ code of Trustmark Corporation
 TRNA (adenine22-N1)-methyltransferase, an enzyme